The Roads to Freedom is a British 13-part drama serial broadcast on BBC Two in 1970.

Based on the trilogy of novels by Jean-Paul Sartre, The Roads to Freedom deals with the lives of various people in Paris as war with Nazi Germany becomes inevitable. Unusually, the series makes much use of voiceover, using the characters' internal thoughts in the narrative. The series was adapted for television by David Turner and directed by James Cellan Jones. The serial was repeated in 1972 and again in 1977. In July 2022, it was announced that BBC Four would be repeating all 13 episodes. The introduction before the start of this rerun was by Colin Baker, who played the part of Claude.

Script and reception
David Turner spent fifteen months on the script. While Sartre's trilogy is divided into three more or less equal parts – The Age of Reason, The Reprieve and Iron in the Soul – Turner's adaptation was divided as The Age of Reason (6 episodes), The Reprieve (3 episodes) and The Defeated (4 episodes), thereby placing greater emphasis on the protagonists' pre-war lives in Paris.

Reception was mixed. The series drew several comments over its nude scenes and frank sexual references, including a comic yet highly sympathetic portrayal of a homosexual man. Some doubted if Sartre could or should be adapted for television. Episode 5, first broadcast 1 November 1970, includes what may be the first same-sex female kiss on British television, between Alison Fiske and Consuela Chapman.

Characters and cast 
 Mathieu Delarue (Michael Bryant) – an unmarried philosophy professor whose principal wish (like Sartre's) is to remain free
 Daniel (Daniel Massey) – a homosexual friend of both Mathieu and Marcelle
 Marcelle (Rosemary Leach) – Mathieu's pregnant mistress
 Ivich (Alison Fiske) – Boris' sister, to whom Mathieu is attracted
 Boris (Anthony Higgins, listed as Anthony Corlan) – a student of Mathieu
 Brunet (Donald Burton) – Mathieu's Communist friend
 Lola (Georgia Brown) – a fading nightclub chanteuse
 Sarah (Heather Canning) – Gomez's Jewish wife
 Jacques (Clifford Rose) – Mathieu's brother
 Odette (Anna Fox) – Jacques' wife
 Daladier (John Bryans) 
 Claude (Colin Baker)
 Pinette (Norman Rossington) – a soldier

Episodes

Theme music
The show's theme, La Route est Dure, was sung by Georgia Brown, who also  played the part of Lola. Lyrics and music for this song were written by the series' director James Cellan Jones under the pseudonym 'Iago Jones'.

Awards and nominations
The Roads to Freedom was nominated for five BAFTAs (Best Writer, Best Drama Production, Best Actor, Best Actress and Best Design).

In 1971 David Turner won the Writers Guild award for 'Best British Television Dramatization: Jean Paul Sartre's Roads To Freedom (BBC)'.

Legacy
Until 2022, the serial had never received a home media release in any format, although all episodes were retained in the BBC's archives. In 2011, considerable interest was generated by a screening of episodes 7,8 and 9 as part of a BFI season dedicated to director James Cellan Jones. The following year a "rare and complete screening" took place at the BFI South Bank, with all thirteen 45-minute episodes being shown on the 12 & 13 May.

Peter Hitchens recalled watching the original 1970 broadcast in May 2022: "the drama’s subject matter went beyond pure politics to deal with abortion, philosophy, general disillusion, homosexuality, the morality of war and of communism – and the desire for freedom for its own sake. And when the TV version began, I and many others watched with amazement as a national channel gave itself over once a week to such subversion. There was not a taboo it did not break." According to Hitchens, Daniel, the gay character, "was played with great wit and force by Daniel Massey, who nearly stole the whole show from the official star, Michael Bryant."

In July 2022, the series was re-broadcast on BBC Four, and made available on BBC iPlayer.  Colin Baker commented: "It was an extraordinary experience to be in an adaptation of a great writer’s work in which all the characters – almost without exception – were flawed, damaged, depressed to the point of self-destruction or in my case just plain bad. The producer David Conroy.. and James Cellan Jones were geniuses at the top of their game. I was very lucky to get such a start in my television career."

References

External links 

1970 British television series debuts
1970 British television series endings
1970s British drama television series
BBC television dramas
English-language television shows
Television shows based on French novels
Fiction set in 1938
Television series set in the 1930s
Television series set in 1940